750 Oskar is a minor planet orbiting the Sun that was discovered by Johann Palisa on 28 April 1913 in Vienna. Photometric observations made in 2012 at the Organ Mesa Observatory in Las Cruces, New Mexico, produced a light curve with a period of 6.2584 ± 0.0002 hours and a brightness variation of 0.21 ± 0.02 in magnitude. This is a member of the Nysa family of asteroids that share similar orbital elements.

References

External links
 
 

Nysa asteroids
Oskar
Oskar
F-type asteroids (Tholen)
19130428